Following is a list of primary and secondary schools in the Asian country of Oman. Tertiary schools are included in the separate list of universities and colleges in Oman.

Most of these schools are located in Muscat, the capital of Oman.

A–M

 Ahmed Bin Majid Private School (ABM) - Muscat
 Al Shomoukh International School - Muscat
 Al Ibdaa International School - Muscat
 Al Injaz Private School- Muscat
 Sri Lankan School Muscat (SLSM) – Muscat
 Al Sahwa Schools - Muscat
 A' Soud Global School - Muscat
 American British Academy (ABA) – Muscat
 The American International School Muscat (TAISM) – Muscat
 Bangladesh School Muscat (BSM) – Muscat
 British School Muscat (BSM) – Muscat
 British School Salalah (BSS) – Salalah
 Beaconhouse Private School (BPS) – Muscat
 Cheltenham Muscat (CCM) – Muscat
 Downe House Muscat (DHM) – Muscat
 Indian School, Al Wadi Al Kabir (ISWK) – Muscat
 Indian School Al Ghubra (ISG) – Muscat

 Indian School Ibri (ISI) –  Ibri

 Indian School Al Maabela (ISAM) – Maabela, Muscat
 Indian School Darsait (ISD) – Darsait, Muscat
 Indian School Muladha (ISM) – Muladha
 Indian School Muscat (ISM) – Darsait, Muscat
 Indian School Salalah (ISS) – Salalah
 Indian School Sohar (ISS) – Sohar
 Innovators Private School (IPS) - Muscat
 The International School of Choueifat – Muscat 
 The Gulf International School - Muscat
 The International School of Oman (ISO) - Muscat
 Lycée Français de Mascate (LFM) – Muscat
 Madinat Al-Sultan Qaboos Private School (MSQPS) – Muscat 
 Muscat International School (MIS) – Muscat
 Modern Generation Private School (MGPS) – Ma'bilah, Muscat

N–Z

 Sri Lankan School Muscat (SLSM) – Muscat
 Pakistan School Muscat (PSM) – Darsait, Muscat
 Pakistan School Nizwa (PSN) – Nizwa
 Salalah International School (SIS) – Salalah
 Sohar International School (SIS) – Sohar
 Future Science International School (FSIS) - Sohar
 Sultan's School – Seeb

 Tunisian school ( Muscat)

See also

 Education in Oman
 Lists of schools

Schools
Schools
Oman
Oman
Schools